Hubert Morse Blalock Jr. (August 23, 1926 – February 8, 1991) was an American sociologist who was internationally known for his major work on statistical research methods.
He was a professor of sociology at the University of Washington, president of the American Sociological Association and a member of the National Academy of Sciences.
According to the National Academies Press, Hubert Blalock "played a major role in shaping the field of sociology during the latter half of the twentieth century".
He married Ann Bonar and had three children, Susan, Kathleen, and James.

Awards and Distinctions 
 the Stouffer Award, presented by the American Sociological Association - 1973
 fellow of the American Statistical Association - 1974
 fellow of the American Academy of Arts and Sciences - 1975
 elected to the National Academy of Sciences - 1976
 president of the American Sociological Association in 1978–1979

Notable works 
 textbook "Social Statistics"

References

External links
National Academy of Sciences Biographical Memoir

1926 births
1991 deaths
American sociologists
Fellows of the American Statistical Association
Members of the United States National Academy of Sciences
University of Michigan faculty
University of North Carolina at Chapel Hill alumni